The Moscow Suvorov Military School (MsSVU) is a military educational institution of secondary education of the Ministry of Defense of Russia. It was the first of the Suvorov Military Schools founded in the Soviet Union.

History 
The Moscow Suvorov Military School was formed as the Gorky Suvorov Military School between 4 July 1944 and 1 October 1944. The Gorky Suvorov School was home to the best teachers and experienced military officers in the Red Army. On 30 August 1956, the Gorky Suvorov Military School was relocated to Moscow. Since November 1957, the Moscow Suvorov Military School took part in all military parades that took place on Red Square. In 1964, the school switched to a three-year curriculum. They began to take boys after 8th grade at the age of 15–16 years. On 21 December 1991, the school was redeployed to Moscow.

Location 
In Moscow, it was originally located near the Fili metro station. In 1991, it was transferred to Winding Passage, Building 11 (Babushkinskaya), where it is located to this day. Since 2011, the graduation of Suvorovites has been carried out on Cathedral Square in the Moscow Kremlin. Opposite the school is the Moscow Border Institute of the FSB of the Russian Federation.

Heads of the School 
The following is a list of heads of the school since 1944:

 1944-1950 - Major-General Karp Zheleznikov
 1950-1953 - Major-General Guri Smirnov
 1953-1956 - Major-General Boris Anisimov
 1956-1961 - Major-General Leonid Vagin
 1961-1963 - Colonel Grigory Muslanov 
 1963-1965 - Major-General Sergei Savchenko
 1965-1973 - Major-General Vasily Fedotov
 1973-1982 - Major-General Pyotr Kivolya
 1982-1991 - Major-General Ivan Sumenkov
 1991-1998 - Major-General Nikolay Kornilov
 1998-2006 - Major-General Vyacheslav Roshchin
 2006-2009 - Major-General Andrei Nechaev
 2010-2011 - Colonel Alexander Tomashov
 2011-2013 - Alexander Aglushevich
 2013-2017 - Major-General Alexander Kasyanov
 2017–Present - Lieutenant-General Victor Polyakov

Alumni 
During its existence, the school had conducted 63 graduations. Many of its pupils eventually became the Heroes of the Soviet Union and veterans of the Soviet-Afghan War. Notable alumni have included:

 Igor Ivanov — Foreign Minister of Russia from 1998 to 2004.
 Andrey Bocharov — 5th Governor of Volgograd Oblast
 Stas Namin — Leader of the Soviet music group, Tsvety and the grandson of Soviet politician Anastas Mikoyan..
 Vladimir Gruzdev — 4th Governor of Tula Oblast
 Vladimir Makarenko — Russian orientalist, linguist, lexicographer, and translator.
 Igor Sergun — Director of GRU from 2011 to 2016.
 Yuri Podkopaev

Gallery

References 

Suvorov Military School
Education in Moscow
Educational institutions established in 1944
Military education and training in the Soviet Union
1945 establishments in the Soviet Union